Jordan first participated at the Olympic Games in 1980, and has sent athletes to compete in every Summer Olympic Games since then. The nation has never participated in the Winter Olympic Games, however at the 1992 Albertville Olympics 43-year-old Mohamed Hadid competed for Jordan in the demonstration sport of speed skiing.

Jordan won its first official ever medal at the Olympic Games at Rio de Janeiro in 2016, when Ahmad Abughaush won gold in the Men's 68 kg tournament in Taekwondo. Jordan won its second official medal at the 2020 Summer Olympics in Tokyo with yet another taekwondo achievement as Saleh Al-Sharabaty won a silver medal in the 80 kg category.

Samer Kamal and Ihsan Abu-Sheikha won two bronze medals in Taekwondo at the 1988 Summer Olympics at Seoul, South Korea when Taekwondo was just introduced into the Olympic Games; however, it was introduced only as a demonstration sport and therefore, are not official medals.

The National Olympic Committee for Jordan was created in 1957 and recognized by the International Olympic Committee in 1963.

The Jordan Olympic Committee is now headed by Prince Faisal Bin Al Hussein.

Medal tables

Medals by Summer Games

Medals by sport

List of medalists

See also

 List of flag bearers for Jordan at the Olympics
 :Category:Olympic competitors for Jordan

References

External links
 
 
 

 
Olympics